Picrophloeus is a genus of flowering plants belonging to the family Gentianaceae.

Its native range is Malesia to New Guinea.

Species:

Picrophloeus belukar 
Picrophloeus collinus 
Picrophloeus javanensis 
Picrophloeus rugulosus

References

Gentianaceae
Gentianaceae genera